Hoben Park, also known as Arcade Park, Nile Park and Ladies Park, is a city park on the waterfront of Seward, Alaska.  It is bounded by the Alaska Sealife Center, the Seward Depot, Railroad Avenue, and Resurrection Bay.  The park's north and west sides have a decorative concrete wall, part of which is original to the park's 1923 construction date.  The park has been generally restored to its 1920s appearance, although the north side has been shortened due to road widening.  Construction of park formed a major part of the city's self-promotion as the "Gateway to Alaska", and was timed to be finished in time for the visit to the city by President Warren G. Harding on July 13, 1923, when completion of the Alaska Railroad was celebrated.  The park is named for Hedley V. "Harry" Hoben, a prominent local citizen who was mayor in 1918–19.  Hoben promoted the park and paid for its maintenance until his death in 1948.

The park was listed on the National Register of Historic Places in 2006.

See also
National Register of Historic Places listings in Kenai Peninsula Borough, Alaska

References

1923 establishments in Alaska
Buildings and structures completed in 1923
National Register of Historic Places in Kenai Peninsula Borough, Alaska
Parks on the National Register of Historic Places in Alaska
Tourist attractions in Seward, Alaska
Protected areas of Kenai Peninsula Borough, Alaska